Club Atlético Marbella were a Spanish football team based in Marbella, in the autonomous community of Andalusia. Founded in 1947 and dissolved in 1997, it was also the reserve team of CD Málaga for a time.

History
Atlético Marbella had its heyday in the mid-1990s, with four consecutive appearances in the second division, having spent the vast majority of its early existence in the third (after Segunda División B was created in 1977, it became the fourth level) and the regional leagues.

Until 1995 the club was owned by Jesús Gil, a controversial businessman and also mayor of Marbella, as well as the chairman of Atlético Madrid. Subsequently, he sold it to Slobodan "Boban" Petrović, an entrepreneur from Serbia.

Finally, in 1997, CA Marbella disappeared, due to the many debts contracted in previous seasons.

Club background
Atlético Marbella – (1947–97)
Marbella FC – (1997–currently)

Season to season

4 seasons in Segunda División
6 seasons in Segunda División B
18 seasons in Tercera División

References

External links
Club blog 

Defunct football clubs in Andalusia
Association football clubs established in 1947
Association football clubs disestablished in 1997
1947 establishments in Spain
1997 disestablishments in Spain
Sport in Marbella
Segunda División clubs